FM 90.7 was a short term summer station in Whakatane New Zealand which operated between 5 January 1982 and 31 January 1982. This station is notably the very first FM station in New Zealand. FM 90.7 was operated as a summer station by Radio Bay Of Plenty Ltd who also operate a permanent station called One Double X or 1XX.

Station programming
The station only operated during the late afternoon and evenings from 4pm to midnight operating 2 shifts. Each night of the week FM 90.7 would play a different format programme to cater to different audiences. 
 Monday: Country
 Tuesday: Album Rock
 Wednesday: Classical Music
 Thursday: Jazz
 Friday: Rock and Soul Music
 Saturday: Top 40 Music
 Sunday: Big Band & Beautiful Music

Outside these broadcast times the station was simply off the air, 1XX continued to operate its usual programme on 1242AM and was not allowed to broadcast its programme on this FM frequency. 1XX did not obtain its own permanent FM licence until 1988. FM 90.7 also made a return to the air during the following summer of 1982/83.

External links
FM 90.7 History
1XX Website

Radio stations in New Zealand
Mass media in Whakatāne
Defunct radio stations in New Zealand